Bertil Persson may refer to:

 Bertil Persson (alpine skier)
 Bertil Persson (bishop) 
 Bertil Persson (potter)